Gochh is a village and part of Union council Achh Tehsil Kharian District Gujrat in the Punjab, Pakistan. The caste of the gochh people are Jutt. The Achh is located at south on the other side of the road which links to the major highway running from Barnala Kashmir to Kotla Arab Ali Khan. The caste of Achh people is Awan Malik and they don't have caste relation with Gochh.  The village is named after Baba Guchha, the founder.

"Govt. High School Gochh for Boys" and "Govt. High School Gochh for Girls" are the major educational institutions serving Gochh and the surrounding villages which include Gorha, Plagran, Asar and Kulian.

Union councils of Gujrat District
Populated places in Gujrat District